Snooker 19 is a 2019 sports video game developed by Lab42 and published by Ripstone Games, based on the cue sport snooker. The game was released  on 17 April 2019 for Microsoft Windows, PlayStation 4 and Xbox One, with the Nintendo Switch version coming out on 23 August 2019. All 128 players from the World Snooker Tour appear in the game, as do venues from all 26 tournaments, including Alexandra Palace and the Crucible Theatre.

Gameplay
Snooker 19 includes all officially licensed tournaments from the 2018/2019 snooker season. It features single-player, multiplayer and online multiplayer modes.

The game featured full likenesses for all tour players, and the Q School qualification events for the main tour. Matches include in-game commentary by Neal Foulds, and David Hendon, as well as refereeing by Brendan Moore. Multiplayer matches mirror real-life tournaments, with in-game tournaments co-existing with events, though all events are played under a "single table" set up.

Release
Prior to the release of Snooker 19, Joanne Williams (wife of 2018 world champion Mark Williams) accused the game of "massive prejudice" as the game's cover art did not feature Williams. Williams commented that the decision was due to him being over 40 years old and Welsh. This led to fans imposing pictures of a naked Williams over the cover art for the release.

Snooker 19 was released on 17 April 2019 for Microsoft Windows, PlayStation 4 and Xbox One. The Nintendo Switch version came out on 23 August 2019.

In April 2020, a Virtual Snooker World Championship took place, contested by the top 16 players on the PS4 version of the game. The matches were released on the official World Snooker Tour YouTube channel, with each player representing a real-life pro in the tournament.

A mobile port was released in August 2020 under the title WST Snooker.

References

External links
 World Snooker Official Website
 Official Game Website
 Publisher Game Website
 Developer Game Website

2019 video games
Cue sports video games
Nintendo Switch games
PlayStation 4 games
Snooker video games
Video games developed in the United Kingdom
Windows games
Xbox One games